The Excellence class, including the sub-classes Helios class and XL  or Excel class, is a class of cruise ships ordered by Carnival Corporation & plc for its subsidiary brands AIDA Cruises, Costa Cruises, P&O Cruises and Carnival Cruise Line. The ships are being constructed by Meyer Werft at their shipyard in Papenburg, Germany, and Meyer Turku at their shipyard in Turku, Finland. The first, entered service for AIDA Cruises in 2018.

History 
In March 2015, Carnival Corporation entered into a strategic partnership with Meyer Werft to build new ships between 2018 and 2022. In June 2015, four ships were ordered for delivery between 2019 and 2020.  In September 2016, three more ships were ordered for Carnival Cruise Line and P&O Cruises for delivery in 2020 and 2022.

The Excellence class will be the first cruise ships in the world to be dual fueled by liquefied natural gas (LNG) and traditional fuel oil, which is intended to make them more environmentally friendly than traditional, diesel-powered ships. Each ship is expected to cost $950 million.

The first four ships in the class suffered delivery delays. The delays of AIDAnova, Costa Smeralda and Mardi Gras were attributed to the ships being the first to be fueled by LNG, design complexities, difficulties coordinating subcontractors, and the large size of the ships. The delay of Iona was due to a temporary suspension of operations by P&O Cruises, and slower construction progress, in response to the COVID-19 pandemic. Mardi Gras was later delayed until 2021, also due to the pandemic.

Ships

References

External links

 Costa Croisières commande deux paquebots géants propulsés au GNL
 Meyer décroche trois paquebots géants pour P&O et Carnival Cruise Lines

Cruise ship classes